Leslie Chew Kwee Hoe  PBM is a Singaporean legal academic and law professor. He is the founding Dean of the School of Law, Singapore University of Social Sciences, Singapore's third law school. Chew is also a Senior Consultant with RHTLaw Asia LLP. Chew is the founding President of the Asia Pacific Institute of Experts.

Career 
Chew was appointed Senior Counsel in 2000.

In 2002, Chew was awarded the Public Service Medal by the President of the Republic of Singapore for his contributions to the Military Court of Appeal.

Chew started his legal career as a legal service officer from 1978 to 1981 before leaving for private practice, first serving in Lee & Lim before joining KhattarWong & Partners where he became Joint Managing Partner. He then joined Gurbani & Co. From 2007 to 2014, Chew was a District Judge and subsequently a Senior District Judge heading the Civil Justice Division of the State Courts (previously known as the Subordinate Courts). After a distinguished career on the Bench, Chew retired in 2014.

In 2016, Chew was appointed the founding Dean of the School of Law, Singapore University of Social Sciences.

Chew has also published a book on arbitration, entitled "Introduction to the Law and Practice of Arbitration in Singapore".

References

External links 

 Faculty CV

Year of birth missing (living people)
Living people
Singaporean Senior Counsel
Singapore University of Social Sciences
Singaporean people of Chinese descent
National University of Singapore alumni